After the Lovin' is an album by English singer Engelbert Humperdinck, released in 1976. The album was nominated for a Grammy in 1977 in the category Best Pop Vocal Performance, Male, but did not win.

Track listing

References

External links 
 
 

1976 albums
Engelbert Humperdinck albums
Albums produced by Charles Calello
Epic Records albums